Sunnova Energy is an American residential and commercial solar energy company based in Houston, Texas.

History 
The company was founded in 2012.

In 2019, the company began selling shares on the New York Stock Exchange and in 2022 it was described as one of America’s largest rooftop solar companies.

References 

Solar energy companies of the United States

Energy companies established in 2012
Renewable resource companies established in 2012
2012 establishments in Texas
American companies established in 2012
Companies based in Houston
Companies listed on the Nasdaq
2019 initial public offerings